Hamzah Sahat is a retired Bruneian airman and the 11th Commander of the Royal Brunei Armed Forces (RBAF) who served in post from September 2020 until his retirement in March 2022.  He previously held the position as the 14th Commander of the Royal Brunei Air Force (RBAirF) from 2018 to 2020.

Education
Throughout his career, he was sent to several training institutes, which include the Initial Officer Training (IOT) and Basic Flying Training (BFT) at Royal Air Force College Cranwell, Cranwell, Lincolnshire, England in 1989; the Advanced Flying Training (AFT) at RAF Valley, Isle of Anglesey, Wales in 1990; Tactical Weapon Unit (TWU) at RAF Chivenor, Devon, England from 1990 to 1991; Qualified Flying Instructor (QFI) course at RAF Topcliffe and RAF Linton-on-Ouse, Yorkshire, England in 1997; 6th Advanced Command and Staff Course (ACSC) at Joint Services Command and Staff College, Oxfordshire, England; and graduated from King's College London with Master of Arts (MA) in 2002; attended National Defence College (NDC) at New Delhi, India; and graduated from University of Madras, the Master of Philosophy (MPhil) with First Class in Defence and Strategic Studies in 2010.

Military career
From 1992 to 1997, he flew Bolkow BO105 helicopters, before returning from the United Kingdom to be an instructor for the Pilatus PC-7 MkII trainer aircraft in 1997. Hamzah Sahat later held the position of a Flight Commander Fixed Wing (Flt Comd FW) and Officer Commanding (OC) at the Flying Training School (FTS) in 2000.

He became a Staff Officer Grade 2 (SO2) Operation after returning to Brunei from the UK in 2003.  Later assigned as a Staff Officer Grade 1 (SO1) Operation to the Royal Brunei Armed Forces' (RBAF) Directorate of Operation at the Ministry of Defence in 2005, but returned to RBAirF's Commanding Officer (CO) of Operation Wing in 2007.  He held another important position as the Chief of Staff (COS) of Joint Force Headquarters (JFHQ) from 2010 to 2012, before being assigned to the role of Deputy Commander of the RBAirF.  Hamzah Sahat was appointed as the Joint Force Commander of the RBAF on 19 December 2014.

On 17 August 2018, the role of Commander of the RBAirF was succeeded by him and held that position until 28 August 2020, his successor Brigadier general Mohammad Sharif would then take on his role.  He attended the 15th ASEAN Air Chief Conference (AACC) hosted by the Republic of Singapore Air Force (RSAF) on 1 September of that same year, and also attended RSAF's 50th Anniversary parade at Tengah Air Base.  During his time in command, he saw the introduction of a new grey Digital Disruptive Pattern (D2P) design fabric for the RBAirF's uniform in 2019.

The handover ceremony between Hamzah Sahat and Mohammad Sharif Ibrahim was held at Royal Brunei Air Force Base, Rimba, Bandar Seri Begawan on 28 August 2020. On 1 September 2020, Hamzah Sahat officially became the 11th Commander of the RBAF and succeeded Aminan Mahmud.

Personal life
Hamzah Sahat is married to Dr. Hajah Anita Binurul Zahrina and has two children together.  When spare time allows, he enjoys reading, and playing volleyball and golf.

Honours

Namesakes
 Hamzah Loop, road name in the Royal Brunei Air Force Base, Rimba, officiated on 22 April 2022.

National

 :
  Order of Pahlawan Negara Brunei First Class (PSPNB) – Dato Seri Pahlawan 15 August 2015
  Order of Seri Paduka Mahkota Brunei Third Class (SMB)
  Pingat Indah Kerja Baik (PIKB)
  Golden Jubilee Medal – 5 October 2017
  Silver Jubilee Medal – 5 October 1992
  General Service Medal
  Long Service Medal (Armed Forces)
  Royal Brunei Armed Forces Golden Jubilee Medal – 31 May 2011

Foreign
 :
  Pingat Jasa Gemilang (Tentera) (PJG) (Meritorious Service Medal [Military]) – 8 December 2020
  Darjah Utama Bakti Cemerlang (DUBC) – 12 July 2022

References

External links

Living people
Bruneian military leaders
Royal Brunei Air Force officers
Graduates of the Royal Air Force College Cranwell
Alumni of King's College London
University of Madras alumni
Year of birth missing (living people)
National Defence College, India alumni